Emmanuel Kwamina Amonoo (born September 11) also known by the stage name Quamina MP is a Ghanaian musician and record producer.

Early life
Quamina MP was born on the 11th of September in Takoradi. He lived and was brought up in Mankessim where he had his basic education. He attended St Marys Senior High School for his secondary education. He then proceeded to Ghana Communication Technology University for his tertiary education in which he had to drop out due to his parents' low financial status.

Music career
Quamina learnt how to create beats around 2014 to support his choice to pursue music fulltime after dropping out of university. In 2017, he met Ground Up Chale, a talent recruiting and music managing platform which gave him his big break in the music industry in Ghana with the song Wiase Y3d3.

He lost his dad in November 2020 to a road accident after they were travelling together.

Notable performances
Quamina MP has performed at Rapperhorlic Concert, Afrochella, Detty Rave, Bhim Concert, Tidal Rave, Ghana Rocks, Vodafone Ghana Music Awards, Ghana hall Party(London) Ghana music awards (London) and Ghana Independence  Party (Manchester).

Discography

Singles
Quamina MP - Wiase Y3d3
Quamina MP - Ohia Y3 Forkin
Quamina MP - Wo Y3 Guy
Quamina MP - Change Your Style
Quamina MP - Amanfuor Girls
Quamina MP - Party
Quamina MP - Feel Okay
Quamina MP - Back To Sender Feat Kofi Kinaata

EP
African Print EP
Bongo EP

Awards and nominations

References

Living people
Ghanaian rappers
21st-century Ghanaian musicians
Year of birth missing (living people)
21st-century male musicians
Male rappers
21st-century rappers
People from Sekondi-Takoradi
People from Central Region (Ghana)